Nipponaphera is a genus of sea snails, marine gastropod mollusks in the family Cancellariidae, the nutmeg snails.

Species
Species within the genus Nipponaphera include:

 Nipponaphera agastor Bouchet & Petit, 2008
 Nipponaphera argo Bouchet & Petit, 2008
 Nipponaphera cyphoma Bouchet & Petit, 2002
 Nipponaphera goniata Bouchet & Petit, 2002
 Nipponaphera habei Petit, 1972
 Nipponaphera iwaotakii Habe, 1961
 Nipponaphera kastoroae (Verhecken, 1997)
 Nipponaphera nodosivaricosa (Petuch, 1979)
 Nipponaphera pardalis Bouchet & Petit, 2002
 Nipponaphera paucicostata (G.B. Sowerby III, 1894)
 Nipponaphera quasilla (Petit, 1987)
 Nipponaphera semipellucida (A. Adams & Reeve, 1850)
 Nipponaphera suduirauti (Verhecken, 1999)
 Nipponaphera teramachii (Habe, 1961a)
 Nipponaphera tuba Bouchet & Petit, 2008
 Nipponaphera wallacei Petit & Harasewych, 2000

References

 Habe T. (1961). Coloured illustrations of the shells of Japan (II). Hoikusha, Osaka. xii + 183 + 42 pp., 66 pls.
 Hemmen J. (2007). Recent Cancellariidae Annotated and illustrated catalogue of Recent Cancellariidae. Privately published, Wiesbaden. 428 pp.

External links